Ralston is a city in Douglas County, Nebraska, United States. The population was 6,494 at the 2020 census. A suburb of Omaha, Ralston is surrounded on three sides by the city of Omaha by 84th, 72nd, and L Streets, and by Sarpy County (Harrison Street) on the south side.

History
The area of the townsite was established on May 23, 1907 with the sale of 282.7 acres of land owned by Omaha newspaper editor George L Miller to the Ralston Investment Company.  A year later the town was platted by future Omaha mayor Roy N. Towl. A petition to incorporate the property as a village was submitted to the Douglas County Board of Commissions on June 22, 1912, which was adopted by the Board two days later on June 24.

The still nascent village experienced a devastating blow to its development on Easter, March 23, 1913, when a tornado tore through the downtown area. The 1913 Easter Tornado was part of a March 1913 tornado outbreak sequence that ripped through the Southern and Midwestern regions of the United States.

In 1934, following a fire that destroyed half a city block, Ralston declared bankruptcy; it was one of the first cities in the United States to do so.

Geography
Ralston is located at  (41.202198, -96.037168).

The nearest hospital is Bergan Mercy Hospital (3.7 miles) located in Omaha.

Demographics

2010 census
At the time of the 2010 census, the city had a total population of 5,943 people. There was a total of 2,581 households, of which 1,560 households were made of families. The racial makeup of the city was 89.7% White, 2.6% African American, 0.4% Native American, 0.8% Asian, 4.6% from other races, and 1.9% from two or more races. Hispanic or Latino of any race were 10.0% of the population.

There were 2,581 households, of which 27.6% had children under the age of 18 living with them, 45.6% were married couples living together, 10.8% had a female householder with no husband present, 4.0% had a male householder with no wife present, and 39.6% were non-families. 32.9% of all households were made up of individuals, and 13% had someone living alone who was 65 years of age or older. The average household size was 2.30 and the average family size was 2.94.

The median age in the city was 40 years. 22.2% of residents were under the age of 18; 8.7% were between the ages of 18 and 24; 25.1% were from 25 to 44; 27.7% were from 45 to 64; and 16.3% were 65 years of age or older. The gender makeup of the city was 49.1% male and 50.9% female.

2000 census
As of the census of 2000, there were 6,314 people, 2,538 households, and 1,697 families residing in the city. The population density was 3,725.7 people per square mile (1,442.5/km). There were 2,601 housing units at an average density of 1,534.8 per square mile (594.2/km). The racial makeup of the city was 94.96% White, 1.24% African American, 0.16% Native American, 1.16% Asian, Pacific Islander, 1.58% from other races, and 0.86% from two or more races. Hispanic or Latino of any race were 4.39% of the population.

There were 2,538 households, out of which 32.5% had children under the age of 18 living with them, 53.8% were married couples living together, 9.1% had a female householder with no husband present, and 33.1% were non-families. 27.0% of all households were made up of individuals, and 7.5% had someone living alone who was 65 years of age or older. The average household size was 2.46 and the average family size was 3.00.

In the city, the population was spread out, with 24.6% under the age of 18, 8.6% from 18 to 24, 31.3% from 25 to 44, 24.1% from 45 to 64, and 11.4% who were 65 years of age or older. The median age was 36 years. For every 100 females, there were 98.2 males. For every 100 females age 18 and over, there were 95.1 males.

As of 2000 the median income for a household in the city was $47,252, and the median income for a family was $58,360. Males had a median income of $35,898 versus $27,475 for females. The per capita income for the city was $23,230. About 0.6% of families and 1.9% of the population were below the poverty line, including none of those under age 18 and 3.2% of those age 65 or over.

Education
The local school district is Ralston Public Schools. Ralston High School opened on Lakeview Drive in 1954; it is now at 8969 Park Drive.  The old high school building was converted to the middle school.  In 2006, Ralston High School's enrollment jumped from 850 students to 1090 students.

The Ralston Public Library opened in 1922 and was first located in the Stewart Real Estate Office. Two years later it was moved to the Centennial room in the basement level of City Hall. In 1963, the library moved to 7900 Park Lane.  In May 1999, it returned to the downtown area and was renamed the Baright Public Library; it is currently at 5555 South 77th Street.

Attractions

The Ralston Arena opened October 19, 2012 and serves as the home of the Omaha Lancers hockey team, the Omaha Beef indoor football team, and was the home of UNO Mavericks men's basketball team until Baxter Arena opened in 2015. On January 1, 2022, the arena's was officially renamed the Liberty First Credit Union Arena.

Local Businesses

 1st State Bank - 1st.BANK
Awarded the 2018 Business of the Year by the Ralston Chamber of Commerce.

References

External links

 
 Ralston Public Schools Website
 Ralston Area Chamber of Commerce
 Baright Public Library
 Liberty First Credit Union Arena
 U.S. Census Bureau QuickFacts: Ralston City, Nebraska
 City-Data.com

Cities in Douglas County, Nebraska
Cities in Nebraska
History of Omaha, Nebraska by community area
1912 establishments in Nebraska